The Xerias (from ξερός, "dry") is a river of northern Euboea, Greece. Anciently, it was known as the Callas or Kallas which flowed into the sea near Oreus. The  is on this river near the village of Milies.

References

Geography of Euboea (regional unit)
Rivers of Greece